Waqarullah Ishaq (born 2 December 1999) is an Afghan cricketer. He made his List A debut for Mis Ainak Region in the 2017 Ghazi Amanullah Khan Regional One Day Tournament on 11 August 2017.

In December 2017, he was named in Afghanistan's squad for the 2018 Under-19 Cricket World Cup.

He made his first-class debut for Boost Region in the 2018 Ahmad Shah Abdali 4-day Tournament on 1 March 2018. In September 2018, he was named in Kandahar's squad in the first edition of the Afghanistan Premier League tournament. He made his Twenty20 debut on 8 October 2019, for Boost Defenders in the 2019 Shpageeza Cricket League.

References

External links
 

1999 births
Living people
Afghan cricketers
Boost Defenders cricketers
Kandahar Knights cricketers
Mis Ainak Knights cricketers
Place of birth missing (living people)